Qutañani (Aymara qutaña dam, -ni a suffix to indicate ownership, "the one with a dam", also spelled Cotanani) is a mountain in the eastern extensions of the Apolobamba mountain range in Bolivia, about  high. It is situated in the La Paz Department, Bautista Saavedra Province, Curva Municipality. Qutañani lies southwest of K'usilluni.

References 

Mountains of La Paz Department (Bolivia)